Joget Workflow is an open-source web-based workflow software to develop workflow and business process management applications.

It is also a rapid application development platform that offers full-fledged agile development capabilities (consisting of processes, forms, lists, CRUD and UI), not just back-end EAI/orchestration/integration or the task-based interface.

Joget Workflow is implemented using Java Spring Framework and is deployed on Apache Tomcat server.

See also 
 Business Process Management
 Workflow
 Rapid Application Development

References

External links
 Official website

Workflow applications
Java enterprise platform
Java (programming language) libraries
Free software programmed in Java (programming language)